Type 81 was a class of U-boats built during World War I by the Kaiserliche Marine.

Type 81 U-boats carried 12 torpedoes and had various arrangements of deck guns. U 81 to U 83 had one  deck gun with 140-240 rounds. U 84 - U 86 were constructed with two  deck guns. In 1917, U 84 - U 86 were converted to a carry one 10.5 cm and one 8.8 cm deck gun and carried 240 rounds.

Many arrangements from the Type 81 and the next two types were also seen on the World War II Type IX U-boats when their design work took place 20 years later.

Compared to the previous type 63, the 81s were  longer, while the pressure hull remained the same. They carried 12 torpedoes instead of 6, and by 1917 all type 87s had the larger 10.5 cm deck gun versus the twin 8.8 cm on the 63s. Crew size was decreased by 1 to 35.

Compared to the following type 87, the 81s were  longer, yet 5 tons lighter. Their range was 180 miles shorter, but speed was  faster on the surface and  faster submerged. The most significant difference was the addition of 4 more torpedoes and 2 additional bow tubes on the type 87. Type 87 also got the additional crew member back and numbered 36 again.

Type 81 boats were responsible for sinking 3.537% of all allied shipping sunk during the war, taking a total of 427,247 combined tons. They also damaged 89,522 combined tons, and captured 3,462 combined tons.

References

Bibliography

External links 
 

Submarine classes
World War I submarines of Germany
German Type U 81 submarines